The Japanese accentor (Prunella rubida) is a species of bird in the family Prunellidae. It is found in Japan and Sakhalin.

Its natural habitat is temperate forest.

References

Japanese accentor
Birds of Japan
Japanese accentor
Taxonomy articles created by Polbot